The D19E, also known as Đổi mới, is a series of diesel locomotives currently used on the Vietnamese railway network.

History
The series is one of the most recently acquired by state railway company Vietnam Railways; 40 were in service as of 2005, 80 in 2012. The series, of the diesel electric type China Railways CKD7F, was constructed by Chinese manufacturer CSR Ziyang Locomotive Co., Ltd.

No. 901 to 920 (built 2003—2004) and 921 to 940 (built 2006—2007) have a more angular body. No. 941 to 960 (built 2007—2008) were built with a rounded front; in No. 961 to 980 (built 2011—2012) the windows and headlights were modified and the front air intake omitted. From No. 941 the final assembly took place at the Gia Lâm works of Vietnam Railways.

Accidents and incidents

On 10 March 2015 locomotive №968 was written off in an accident near Dien Sanh when it pulled SE5 train was in collision with a lorry on a level crossing.

On May 24, 2018 locomotive No 927 towing the SE19 carrying 400 passengers had an accident in Thanh Hoa because of a collision with a truck, causing two deaths: driver Nguyen The Hung (born 1976) and Nguyen Xuan De (born 1985) The accident investigated was caused by two guards who forgot to close the barriers.

On 27 January, 2022 locomotive No 946 hauling the SE4 was involved in an accident in Phu Ly after crashing into a truck and into a lake. Nobody was killed, and the locomotive was seen hauling expresses in under 5 months.

Galleries

References

External links
 
 CKD7F diesel locomotive, CSR Ziyang, 2009-07-31

Diesel-electric locomotives of Vietnam
CSR Ziyang Locomotive Co., Ltd. locomotives
Metre gauge diesel locomotives
Railway locomotives introduced in 2003